United States v. Continental Can Co., 378 U.S. 441 (1964), was a U.S. Supreme Court case which addressed antitrust issues. One issue it addressed was how should a market segment be defined for purposes of reviewing a merger of companies which manufacture different but related products.

Facts
In 1956, Continental Can Company, the second largest producer of metal containers in the U.S., acquired the Hazel-Atlas Glass Company, the third largest producer of glass containers.

The government sought Continental Can's divestiture of the assets of Hazel-Atlas, arguing that the merger was a violation of Section 7 of the Clayton Antitrust Act. The government claimed ten product markets existed, including the can industry, the glass container industry, and various lines of commerce defined by the end use of the containers.

Judgment
The United States District Court for the Southern District of New York found three product markets: metal containers, glass containers, and beer containers. The district court dismissed the case, holding that the government had failed to prove reasonable probability of lessening competition in the markets it had identified.

Supreme Court

See also
US antitrust law
List of United States Supreme Court cases, volume 378

External links

1964 in United States case law
United States Supreme Court cases
United States Supreme Court cases of the Warren Court
United States antitrust case law